50 series may refer to:

Electronics 

 HP 49/50 series, a type of graphing calculator made by Hewlett-Packard

Trains 

 1–50 series (CTA), a retired subway car type for the Chicago Transit Authority
 EMD SD50, also known as "50 series", a North American diesel locomotive type made by Electro-Motive Diesel
 Kyoto Municipal Subway 50 series operating for the Kyoto Municipal Subway

Trucks 

 Dodge 50 Series, a box truck model operating in Europe

See also 

 Detroit Diesel Series 50, a diesel engine for heavy-duty vehicles